Yoritsugu is a masculine Japanese given name.

Possible writings
Yoritsugu can be written using different combinations of kanji characters. Here are some examples: 

頼次, "rely, next"
頼継, "rely, continue"
頼嗣, "rely, succession"
依次, "to depend on, next"
依継, "to depend on, continue"
依嗣, "to depend on, succession"

The name can also be written in hiragana よりつぐ or katakana ヨリツグ.

Notable people with the name
Yoritsugu Kinoshita (木下 頼継, ????–1600), Japanese samurai
 (1239–1256), Japanese shōgun
 (1562–1626), Japanese samurai

Japanese masculine given names